Nicaragua competed at the 2012 Summer Olympics in London, United Kingdom, held from 27 July to 12 August 2012. This was the nation's twelfth appearance at the Olympics, except the 1988 Summer Olympics in Seoul because of its partial support to the North Korean boycott.

Comité Olímpico Nicaragüense sent a total of 6 athletes to the Games, an equal share between men and women, to compete in 4 different sports, tying its record for the number of athletes with Beijing at a single Olympics. Among these athletes, swimmers Omar Nunez and Dalia Torrez Zamora made their second consecutive appearance. Light heavyweight boxer Osmar Bravo, on the other hand, was the nation's flag bearer at the opening ceremony. Nicaragua, however, has yet to win its first ever Olympic medal.

Athletics

Nicaragua has selected 2 athletes by a wildcard.

Key
 Note – Ranks given for track events are within the athlete's heat only
 Q = Qualified for the next round
 q = Qualified for the next round as a fastest loser or, in field events, by position without achieving the qualifying target
 NR = National record
 N/A = Round not applicable for the event
 Bye = Athlete not required to compete in round

Men

Women

Boxing

Nicaragua has earned one quota in boxing.* 
Men

Swimming

Men

Women

Weightlifting

References

Nations at the 2012 Summer Olympics
2012
2012 in Nicaraguan sport